Vyacheslav Gennadievich Butusov (born 15 October 1961) is a Russian singer-songwriter and composer. He was the lead singer of Nautilus Pompilius and U-Piter. Since 2019, he has been playing in his group "Orden Slavy". He also has a solo career as a singer-songwriter.

Musical career

1982–1997: Nautilus Pompilius 
While he was a first-year student at the Sverdlovsk Architectural Institute, he was acquainted with musician Dmitry Umetsky. The two young men were passionate about music and often gathered to play together. This resulted in the recording of Nautilus Pompilius's first album Pereyezd (Relocation) in 1982, which met with little success. In the same year, Butusov met the poet Ilya Kormiltsev. Together, they recorded the band's first mature album, Nevidimka (Invisible) in 1985. Next year their tandem released the record Razluka (Separation), which sparked the band's popularity. The band's last album, Yablokitai, was recorded by Butusov and Kormiltsev in 1996 in England.

1997–present: Solo career
After Nautilus Pompilius disbanded, Butusov launched his solo career. In 1997, he recorded Nezakonnopozhdenniy AlKhimik doktor faust pernatiy zmey with Yuri Kasparyan, and in 1998, his first solo album, Ovaly. During this years he also had a brief cameo in Russian crime film Brother. In the 2020s, Butusov turned to classical music. He is composing the score for the theatrical piece "Two Tsars", based on the play by Boris Akunin, and is writing a libretto for the symphony project "Lament of Adam".

2001–2017: U-Piter
In 2001 Vyacheslav Butusov founded the band U-Piter with former Kino guitarist Yuri Kasparyan. They have recorded seven albums, the last being Gudgora in 2015. U-Piter was disbanded in 2017.

Personal life
Butusov is married to Anzhelika Estoyeva (born 1970). He has four children: three daughters – Anna (born 1980; with his first wife Mariana Dobrovolskiy-Butusova), Ksenia (born 1991), Sofya (born 1999) and a son Daniil (born 2005).

Discography

Solo albums
 Ovaly (1998)
 Tikhe igry (2001)
 Model dlya sborki (2008)

Collaboration albums
 Most (1985) (with Yevgeniy Dimov as part of the project "Step")
 Nezakonnopozhdenniy AlKhimik doktor faust pernatiy zmey (1997) (with Yuri Kasparyan)
 Elizobarra-Torr (2000) (with Deadушки)
 Zvyodzdniy padl (2001) (with musicians of Kino)

Film soundtracks
 Brother (1997)
 Brother 2 (2000)
 War (2002)
 Dead Man's Bluff (2005)
 Igla remix (remake of The Needle (1988 film) (2010)

Filmography

Publications
Virgostan (2007)
Antidepressant (M., Eksmo, 2007) (Co-authored with Nikolay Yakimchuk)
Arkhiya (2011)

Awards
 Lenin Komsomol Prize (1989) for his songs with Nautilus Pompilius
 Golden Gramophone Award (2004) for his song "City Girl"
 Tsarskoselskaya Khudozhestvennaya Prize (2007)
 Medal "15 years of Kemerovo and Novokuznetsk diocese" (26 March 2009)
 Order "For Merit to the Fatherland" (13 October 2011) Order IV. For his contribution in the development in music, art, and many years of creative activity.

References

External links
Official Website of Butusov & U-Piter Vyacheslav Butusov's current group 
Official Website of Nautilus group Vyacheslav Butusov's worldwide famous group 
Biography of Vyacheslav Butusov 

1961 births
Living people
Musicians from Krasnoyarsk
Russian rock singers
Russian male singer-songwriters
Russian rock guitarists
Russian male guitarists
Russian male film actors
Soviet male singers
Post-punk musicians
20th-century Russian singers
21st-century Russian singers
21st-century Russian writers
20th-century guitarists
21st-century guitarists
20th-century Russian male singers
21st-century Russian male singers
Recipients of the Lenin Komsomol Prize
Recipients of the Order "For Merit to the Fatherland", 4th class